Arbashevo (Arbaş) is a rural locality (a selo) and the administrative center of Arbashevsky Selsoviet, Askinsky District, Bashkortostan, Russia. The population was 209 as of 2010. There are 9 streets.

Geography 
Arbashevo is located 32 km southwest of Askino (the district's administrative centre) by road. Kuchanovo is the nearest rural locality.

References 

Rural localities in Askinsky District